"Jet Black Heart" is a single by Australian pop rock band 5 Seconds of Summer from their second studio album, Sounds Good Feels Good. It was written by Calum Hood, Michael Clifford, David Hodges and Jon Green, and produced by David Hodges. It was released on 17 December 2015 as the album’s third and final single. It charted in six countries and won a Verano MTV Award and a Teen Choice Award. The music video was released on the same day on YouTube and has since gained more than 30 million views.

Background and release
The single was first premiered on air on New Zealand radio on 27 August 2015. It was released as a promotional single on 28 August, an instant download after the album was pre-ordered. It was then released as an official single on 17 December, along with the music video.

The band performed the song for the first time on stage during the second night of their show at Long Island.

Music video
The official music video was released on 17 December 2015, featuring the bandmembers and some of their fans. The video starts off with a message from the band that reads "We asked our fans to help make this video. We wanted to hear your stories. We were overwhelmed with the response. This video goes out to you. Jet Black Heart."

It has over 40 million views, as of 2021.

Track listing
Digital download

Accolades

Personnel
Luke Hemmings – lead vocals, rhythm guitar
Michael Clifford – lead vocals, lead guitar
Calum Hood – lead vocals, bass guitar
Ashton Irwin – backing vocals, drums

Charts

References

2015 singles
2015 songs
5 Seconds of Summer songs
Capitol Records singles
Songs written by Calum Hood
Songs written by David Hodges
Songs written by Michael Clifford (musician)